Ulysse Chevalier (24 February 1841 – 27 October 1923) was a French bibliographer and historian.

Born in Rambouillet, he published many works on the history of Dauphiné, e.g. the cartularies of the church and the town of Die (1868), of the abbey of Saint André le-Bas at Vienne (1869), of the abbey of Notre Dame at Bonnevaux in the diocese of Vienne (1889), of the abbey of Saint Chaifre at Le Monestier (1884), the inventories and several collections of archives of the dauphins of Viennais, and a Bibliothèque liturgique in six volumes (1893–1897), the third and fourth volumes of which constitute the Repertorium hymnologicum, containing more than 20,000 articles.

Chevalier's principal work is the Répertoire des sources historiques du moyen âge. The first part, Bio-bibliographie (1875–1886), contains the names of all the historical personages alive between the years 1 and 1500 who are mentioned in printed books, together with precise references. The second part, Topo-bibliographie (1894–1903), contains not only the names of places mentioned in books on the history of the Middle Ages, but, in a general way, everything not included in the Bio-bibliographie.

The Répertoire as a whole is a mass of useful information, and is one of the most important bibliographical monuments ever devoted to the study of medieval history. Though a Catholic priest and professor of history at the Catholic university of Lyon, the Abbé (afterwards Canon) Chevalier maintained an independent critical attitude even on religious questions. In the controversy on the authenticity of the Shroud of Turin (sudario), he worked by tracing back the history of the cloth, which was undoubtedly used as a shroud, but he argued was not produced before the 14th century and was probably no older (Le Saint Suaire de Lirey-Chambéry, Turin et les défenseurs de son authenticité). In 2006 French historian Emmanuel Poulle wrote in a peer-reviewed journal that Ulysse Chevalier showed in this case intellectual dishonesty. According to Poulle, Chevalier deliberately did not correctly mention the Papal bulls of antipope Clement VII issued in 1390. In fact Clement VII never opted for the forgery thesis.

In Notre Dame de Lorette. Étude critique sur l’authenticité de la Santa Casa (1906), he built his analysis on false documents, produced in the 19th century, to argue that the miraculous translation of the Santa Casa (the Holy House) was a legend.

References

External links 
 
 

1841 births
1923 deaths
People from Rambouillet
19th-century French historians
20th-century French historians
Members of the Académie des Inscriptions et Belles-Lettres
French bibliographers
Researchers of the Shroud of Turin
French male writers